Maheshwari Chanakyan (born 17 February 1985) better known as V.J. Maheswari is an Indian actress and a former video jockey who predominately appears in Tamil television shows and films. She is best known for playing the role of Kavya in Star Vijay's popular soap opera Puthu Kavithai. She also appeared in the blockbuster film Vikram in 2022.

Early life
Maheshwari was born on the 17 February 1985 to Sreenivasan and Latha in Chennai, Tamil Nadu, India. Maheshwari did her schooling at Adarsh Vidyalaya, T. Nagar, and then graduated from the University of Madras in Chennai.

Career 
In 2010, Maheshwari made her debut in the low-budget film Kuyil. As soon as she made her acting debut she also acted television advertisements shoots and modeling photo shoots. In this period Maheshwari developed interest in anchoring and hosting.

In 2013, she made her television debut as an actress on TV, she appeared in the romantic serial Puthu Kavithai which aired on Star Vijay opposing actor Dinesh. She also appeared in the soap opera Thayumanavan playing the role as Mahalakshmi, the serial also aired on Star Vijay. She later announced that she quit doing serials for some personal reasons and moved on to anchoring.

Maheswari also later anchored and hosted television shows such as Comedy Khiladis and Petta Rap which both aired on Zee Tamil.

In 2021, actor Kamal Haasan approached Maheshwari offering her a role in his film Vikram, she later agreed to the offer and was cast in the film opposite actor Vijay Sethupathi.

Personal life
In the 2005, Maheshwari married Chanakyan, and the couple had a child. However later in 2010 the couple separated and were divorced. She is also a costume designer.

Filmography

Films

Television

References

External links
 
 

Living people
1985 births
21st-century Indian actresses
Actresses in Tamil cinema
Indian television actresses
Indian film actresses
Indian soap opera actresses
Television personalities from Tamil Nadu
Tamil television actresses
Tamil television presenters
People from Chennai
Bigg Boss (Tamil TV series) contestants